The white pages is a listing of telephone subscribers in a telephone directory.

White pages may also refer to:
 White Pages (UDDI), a protocol used to discover Web Services
 Whitepages (company), a provider of contact information for people and businesses, mainly in Canada and the US
 whitepages.com.au, an online searchable Sensis directory of contact information for businesses, government departments, organisations, and people in Australia
 White pages schema, a data model used for organizing the data contained in a directory service

See also
 Yellow Pages (disambiguation)
 Green Pages
 Blue pages
 Directory (databases)
 Common Indexing Protocol
 Digital identity